Dileshwar Kamait is an Indian politician and a member of parliament to the 17th Lok Sabha from Supaul Lok Sabha constituency, Bihar. He won the 2019 Indian general election being a Janata Dal (United) candidate.

References

Living people
India MPs 2019–present
Lok Sabha members from Bihar
Janata Dal (United) politicians
Year of birth missing (living people)